Durham Law School is the law school of Durham University in Durham, England. In 2022, Durham Law was ranked 5th in the UK in a league table which averaged the rankings of the Complete University Guide, The Guardian and the Times University League Table. Durham Law School is ranked 34th in the world for law in the 2022 Times Higher Education ranking and 49th in the world for law by the 2022 QS ranking.

Small group teaching in tutorials taught in academic staff offices are a central part of the School's award-winning legal education. Durham Law School has particular research strengths in the areas of Public Law & Human Rights, Commercial & Corporate Law, EU & International Law and Bio-law with further strengths in Chinese Law and Legal Philosophy.

Volker Roeben is Dean of Durham Law School. The School was congratulated by the House of Commons in Early Day Motion 875 in 2018.

Programmes
Durham Law School offers a three-year LLB degree and a four-year LLB with Year Abroad degree. They are both Qualifying Law Degree programmes for the purpose of practicing as a barrister or solicitor in England and Wales. Durham's law students rank among the very best in the UK for employability. The School offers a wide diversity of modules covering virtually every key area of law with particular strengths in public law, human rights, commercial and corporate law, EU law, international law and biolaw (including medical law) as well as Chinese law, comparative law, family law and jurisprudence.

Taught postgraduate LLM degree programmes include a general Master of Laws LLM, LLM in Corporate Law, LLM in European Trade and Commercial Law, LLM in International Trade and Commercial Law and LLM in International Law and Governance.

Research postgraduate degree programmes include a one-year Master of Jurisprudence MJur and PhD in Law. Durham Law School has a staff common room and a postgraduate student suite that each have panoramic views of Durham Cathedral, a UNESCO World Heritage Site. Durham Castle is a college of the university.

Reputation

Durham Law School is housed in the Palatine Centre, which has been named the most impressive law school building in the world. The findings were published in 2014 by Best Choice Schools who selected the 50 most impressive law schools in the world.

Employability

In 2015, the Chambers Student triennial survey of which universities law firm trainees had attended ranked Durham third behind Oxford and Cambridge, supplying 7.6 per cent of law trainees in the UK (up from 4th in 2012). The survey also placed Durham second (behind Manchester) in supplying national firms (up from 11th in 2012) and third in supplying US firms in London (up from 5th in 2012).

Research

Research centres and groups
Durham Law School supports a range of institutes, centres and groups open to academic staff and law students. These include: the Centre for Chinese Law and Policy (CCLP), the Centre for Criminal Law and Criminal Justice (CCLCJ), the Centre for Ethics and Law in the Life Sciences (Durham CELLS), the Durham European Law Institute (DELI), the Centre for Gender Equal Media (GEM), Gender and Law at Durham (GLAD), the Human Rights Centre (HRC), the Institute of Commercial and Corporate Law (ICCL), Islam, Law and Modernity (ILM) and Law and Global Justice at Durham (LGJ).

Durham's Centre for Chinese Law and Policy is among the largest in Europe. Durham's Dean Thom Brooks introduced Chinese Law into the LLB and LLM curriculum alongside a new annual Chinese law summer school - the first ever in the UK and first time in English outside Asia - in a move described as offering "great career prospects" for Durham Law School graduates beyond what is offered at other UK law schools.

Major areas of research
 Biolaw: including bioethics, medical law and intellectual property issues
 Chinese law
 Comparative law
 Criminal law and criminal justice: including international criminal law, jury trials, organized crime, sentencing and theories of punishment and restorative justice. 
 English private and commercial law: including commercial fraud, consumer law, contract law, corporate law, equity, Europeanisation of private law, intellectual property international trade law, law and economics, restitution, tort law
 EU law: including EU constitutional law, EU external trade, EU competition law, Third Pillar matters
 Gender and law: including discrimination, equality and diversity, feminist legal theory gender and crime and women in the legal professions
 Human rights: including counter-terrorism issues, discrimination law, the Human Rights Act, international human rights law, media freedom and religious liberty
 Legal theory: including jurisprudence, legal realism, moral philosophy, multiculturalism, political philosophy, socio-legal studies and theory of international law
 Public international law: including international human rights law, international humanitarian law, conflict studies, international criminal law and WTO law
 UK public law: including human rights, citizenship, comparative constitutional law, separation of powers, scrutiny of security services and United Kingdom immigration law.

Notable individuals

Notable academics
The following notable individuals are or have been academics of Durham Law School:
 Deryck Beyleveld - Former Head of School
 Leo Blair - Lecturer of Law, father of Tony Blair
 Thom Brooks - Former Dean & Professor of Law and Government
 David Campbell
 Roger Masterman - former Head of School
 David O'Keeffe
 Clare McGlynn - Professor of Law

Notable alumni

Judiciary
 Lady Jill Black (Trevelyan) – second women to become a Justice of the Supreme Court of the United Kingdom; former Lady Justice of Appeal
 James Goss (University) – Justice of the High Court (Queens Bench Division)
 Lord Anthony Hughes (Van Mildert) –- Justice of the Supreme Court of the United Kingdom; former Lord Justice of Appeal; Vice-President of the Criminal Division of the Court of Appeal of England and Wales
Sir Kobina Arku Korsah – Justice of the Supreme Court of Ghana and 1st Chief Justice of Ghana
Koi Larbi – Justice of the Supreme Court of Ghana
 Andrew McFarlane (Collingwood) – President of the Family Division, High Court Judge, Lord Justice of Appeal
Finola O'Farrell (Trevelyan) – Justice of the High Court (Queens Bench Division)
 Robert Strother Stewart (Hatfield & Armstrong) – Justice of the Supreme Court of the Gold Coast Colony and Member of the West African Court of Appeal.
 Caroline Swift (St Aidan's) – leading counsel to the Inquiry in the Shipman Inquiry and Justice of the High Court (Queens Bench Division)
 Mark Waller (King's) – former Lord Justice of Appeal and Vice-President of the Civil Division of the Court of Appeal of England and Wales

Barristers 

 Jolyon Maugham (Hatfield)

Politics
 Graham Brady MP (St Aidan's), Chair of 1922 Committee
 Robert Buckland QC MP (Hatfield),  Secretary of State for Wales 
Nick Gibb (Hild Bede) – Conservative MP for Bognor Regis and Littlehampton (1997 – present), Minister of State for Schools
 Earl Pomeroy, former member of US House of Representatives
 James Wharton, former MP

Media
 Gabby Logan (Hild Bede)

References

External links
 Durham Law School

Durham University
Law schools in England